The Ole Arilsen House, at 89 N. 300 East off Utah State Route 116 in Mount Pleasant, Utah, was built in 1877.  It was listed on the National Register of Historic Places in 1980.

It was built by Ole Arilsen (born 1849 in Denmark), whose family immigrated to Utah in 1862.  The brick house is a good example of folk vernacular architecture of the "2/3 central passageway plan" type, with excellent brickwork.

References

National Register of Historic Places in Sanpete County, Utah
Houses completed in 1877
1877 establishments in Utah Territory